Diaminobutyricimonas aerilata is a species of bacteria from the family Microbacteriaceae which has been isolated from air from the Jeju Island.

References

Microbacteriaceae
Monotypic bacteria genera
Bacteria described in 2013